Ranchore Line, officially named as Gazdarabad, is a neighbourhood in the Karachi South district of Karachi, Pakistan. The neighborhood is one of the oldest in Karachi, and has a predominantly Muslim Marwaris population who hailed from Jaisalmer in Rajasthan from 19th century. Gazadarabad is also home to Karachi's largest Hindu-dominated neighborhood, Narayan Pura.

History
Gazdarabad was formerly called Ranchore Line until around the 1950s. The name of the area was associated with a Hindu named Ranchor. The area was first built in the early days of the British Raj. With time, it became one of the most densely populated areas in the city. Before the independence of Pakistan, the area was home to a majority of Hindus.

After the independence of Pakistan, the Karachi population increased dramatically when hundreds of thousands of Muslim refugees (Muhajirs) from India moved to Pakistan and settled in the city. The minority Hindus and Sikhs migrated to India while many Muslims refugees from India settled in the Karachi.

The name was changed in the honour of Muhammad Hashim Gazdar, who belonged to the Muslim Marwaris community and resided in the locality. Mr. Gazdar had been Mayor of Karachi and one time deputy speaker of the Constitutional Assembly. Gazdarabad is home of Muslim Marwari Community who migrated from Jaisalmer in Rajasthan at and around the beginning of British Raj. These people perfected the art of yellow stone masonry. Their artistic skills can be seen in all the British era buildings in Karachi.

See also
 Silawat
 Muhammad Hashim Gazdar
 Ranchore Line
 Ramswami
 Jubilee Market Area
 Nabi Bux Area
 Garden Police
 Preedy Street Quarters
 Fikri Compound

Saghir shah Bhojani old Kmc contractor Bhojani builders & Developers

External links 
 Karachi Website 

Neighbourhoods of Karachi
Saddar Town